Shea Stadium may refer to:

 Shea Stadium (short name for William A. Shea Municipal Stadium), an American ballpark in New York City; longtime home of the New York Mets Major League Baseball club
 Mets–Willets Point station (LIRR), a seasonal-use station on the Long Island Rail Road's Port Washington Branch, formerly named Shea Stadium
 Mets–Willets Point station (IRT Flushing Line), an elevated subway station on the IRT Flushing Line of the New York City Subway, formerly named Willets Point – Shea Stadium
 Shea Stadium (Peoria, Illinois), privately owned and managed facility; home of Bradley University soccer team
 Shea Stadium (Sacramento, California), home of the Sacramento State Hornets softball team